This is a list of St Helens R.F.C. rugby league footballers who earned selection for an international team while playing for St Helens.

Players

A

B

C

D

E

F

G

H

I

J

K

L

M

N

O

P

R

S

T

V

W

References

 
St Helens RLFC international players